The Church of the Holy Apostles is an Episcopal church, located in Hilo, Hawaii, that belongs to the Episcopal Diocese of Hawaii of the Episcopal Church's Province 8.

Overview
The Episcopal Church in Hawai'i began in 1862 when King Kamehameha IV and Queen Emma invited the Church of England to Hawai‘i. 

The Church of the Holy Apostles in Hilo was founded in 1903, and moved to its current location (1407 Kapi'olani Street, Hilo, Hawai'i 96720), across from the University of Hawaiʻi at Hilo, in 1963. 

There are 130 families are registered at the church. The church encourages diversity and affirms LGBT brothers and sisters.

See also  
Episcopal Diocese of Hawaii of the Episcopal Church (U.S.A.)

References

External link

Official site

1963 architecture
Episcopal church buildings in Hawaii
Buildings and structures in Hilo, Hawaii